Orthotylus curvipennis is a species of bug from a family of Miridae that is endemic to Sicily.

References

Insects described in 1875
Endemic fauna of Sicily
Hemiptera of Europe
curvipennis